The Box, originally named the Video Jukebox Network, was an American broadcast, cable and satellite television network that operated from 1985 to 2001. The network focused on music videos, which through a change in format in the early 1990s, were selected by viewer request via telephone; as such, unlike competing networks (such as MTV and VH1), the videos were not broadcast on a set rotation.

The network was distributed on cable and satellite providers, with additional carriage on over-the-air UHF television stations (mainly on low-power outlets); most of these stations, which later became affiliates of MTV2 following the shutdown of The Box's US operations, have since been sold off as of 2012, while Viacom retains ownership of the other remaining former Box affiliates.

The Box's UK Operations remain on the air today, now fully owned by London-based Channel Four Television Corporation, (after Channel 4 bought out their partners in The Box Plus Network, Germany's Bauer Media Group in 2019).

History
The network originally launched as the Video Jukebox Network in 1985; it was founded by Steve Peters, who launched it on a television station in Miami, Florida. It was initially a product of the Miami Music scene, and was hosted by a group of local Miami Bass rappers known as Miami Boyz. Peters formed a record company called Peter's Records from the revenue earned by the Video Jukebox Network. Despite having his foot in the local Miami Bass scene, and employing hip-hop producers from abroad, none of its artists managed to produce a hit record; the label was shut down before Peters sold The Box to a group which included cable operator TCI and Island Records founder Chris Blackwell. In 1990, Les Garland, co-founder of both MTV: Music Television and VH-1 was brought in to run the network. From 1990-97, Garland, as Executive VP played an essential role in the domestic and international launch of the interactive music channel. He was responsible for entertainment programming, promotion, ad sales and marketing, and he oversaw the rollout of the channel from a base of 200,000 homes at its inception to more than 30 million U.S. households and 25 million households internationally   after, the service – which eventually adopted the shortened name  The Box – began allowing viewers to request videos through a designated telephone number; viewers would be directed to enter a code – which was displayed through an on-screen menu that aired full-screen between videos as well as in a text- and icon-only format on the lower third of the screen during a video broadcast – to request a recent or classic music video to air on the network (this format was reflected in the network's longtime slogan, "Music Television You Control").

At first, all of The Box's request lines used a large block of Miami telephone numbers, and callers were only charged for a long-distance call; however, in order to gain revenue, the network switched to the request line to a 1-900 toll number, with callers being charged from $1.99 to $3.99 per call to make a request of up to three videos. The network was well known for being an "underground" outlet for music videos that were not shown or even banned on MTV, with up to 350 videos selectable at any given time in each of the 170 (by September 1992) different Box affiliates throughout the United States. Each affiliate had a unique playlist, usually customized to the local market, giving great exposure to more local and obscure groups.

Videos cost between 99¢ and $3.99 and, on a national average, took around 20 minutes to be broadcast after being ordered; it was not uncommon for multiple videos to air in succession, nor was it for there to be a gap in videos for several minutes on end (during which time, the request menu was shown). Because the channel's playlist was totally controlled by viewers, anyone could request any video for as many times as they wanted (explaining why some new videos like Bone Thug's "Crossroads" could be seen ten times within an hour). The network was known for its rough-around-the-edges and "bootleg"-like feel, sometimes making it appear like it was of low quality. Despite this, The Box was known to have many popular videos appear in heavy rotation on The Box months before appearing on MTV – Britney Spears' "...Baby One More Time" was seen on The Box many months before "breaking out" for example – and was largely responsible in raising the profile of acts such as Sir Mix-A-Lot and Green Jellÿ. In 1998 Greg Willis was recruited to be SVP Sales and Marketing. The channel brand was upgraded in 1998, to The Box - Music Network and Box Fusion - an online service that sync'd television with the internet.

In May 1999, The Box was acquired by MTV Networks division of Viacom. The Box ceased operations in the United States just over 1½ years later on January 1, 2001, moving operations to the UK; MTV2, which featured a mix of set rotation and viewer request music video blocks at the time, replaced the network on its affiliates, before eventually withdrawing broadcast carriage of MTV2 in the 2010s to return to a cable-only distribution model (the same strategy was pursued with Más Música TeVe a few years later to launch MTV Tres). The concept behind The Box was later revived in 2010 when cable music service Music Choice launched SWRV (now Music Choice Play).

The Box's UK operations (now owned by Channel 4) remain on the air to this day, with the channel run on satellite and via streaming, alongside a number of TV music channels based on Bauer Radio station brands.

Technology
Headends incorporated a video server which allowed for localized content mixes – local demographics could be taken into account for selecting the list of videos available for request or frequently requested genres/bands could be queued automatically. The video server had up to a 64GB HDD and the video programs were compressed in the MPEG2 format. In 2000, The Box had approximately 1,800 music videos in its inventory, 150 to 300 of which were queued across the network, at any given time. Subscribers could call the Interactive Voice Response at The Box's central office to request videos over the phone, which was typical, but could also request over the internet or via set-top box. The central office would then send the data to the individual headends regarding what was ordered.

See also
MTV2
The Box (British and Irish TV channel)

References

Paramount Media Networks
Defunct television networks in the United States
Defunct music video networks
Hip hop television
Television channels and stations established in 1985
Television channels and stations disestablished in 2001
Companies based in Miami
Defunct companies based in Florida
1985 establishments in the United States